Circomedia is a school for contemporary circus and physical theatre based in Bristol, England. The school offers a variety of training courses and workshops that teach circus skills in the context of physical theatre, performance and creativity.

It was founded in 1993 by Bim Mason and Helen Crocker, following the closure of Fooltime, Britain’s first circus school. It is financially supported by Arts Council South West and a range of other funding.

Since 2004, Circomedia has been based in St. Paul's Church at Portland Square, Bristol and a site in Kingswood, Bristol which is home to the degree programme and the main office.

Courses
At the core of the school's training programme is the one-year Diploma in Circus Skills and Physical Theatre, which includes trapeze, juggling, acrobatics and physical theatre. After completing the diploma, students may join the 10-week Act Creation Course, or may undertake teacher training.

Other training programmes include:
 a BA (Hons) in Contemporary Circus with Physical Performance 
 a Foundation Degree (FdA) in Contemporary Circus and Physical Performance in partnership with Bath Spa University
 a BTEC National Diploma in Performance for 16+
 adult evening classes open to the general public
 circus workshops and team-building events

Outreach
Circomedia also runs an outreach programme for local young people.

See also
Dick Penny, formerly a member of the board of Circomedia
Ockham's Razor Theatre Company, formed in 2004 by three Circomedia alumni
Circus school

References

External links
 Circomedia website

Circus schools
St Pauls, Bristol